Astro Air International, Inc., doing business as Pan Pacific Airlines, is a full-service airline based in the Philippines. It was established in 1973 under the name Astro Air International but was renamed as Spirit of Manila Airlines in 2011 and ceased commercial flights after three months of operations. In 2016, the airline relaunched under the current brand after it began operating to serve the South Korean market. The airline commenced operations on April 27, 2017, with its inaugural flight between Kalibo and Seoul. Its current main hubs are Mactan–Cebu International Airport and Kalibo International Airport with flights going to Seoul, Busan and Muan.

History
In 1973, Filipino-Chinese entrepreneur Donald Dee secured a commercial airline license and registered an airline company under the name Astro Air International. The company previously did business under the name Spirit of Manila Airlines from 2011 to 2012, flying from Clark International Airport in Angeles, Pampanga to Taipei Taoyuan International Airport in Taiwan using a fleet of two McDonnell Douglas MD-83 planes and a leased Boeing 737-300. The airline ceased operations after only a few months after it failed to secure an air operator's certificate.

After it received backing from South Korean investors, the company restarted operations in 2016 under its present name and with the goal of connecting the South Korean market with tourist destinations Boracay and Cebu in the Philippines. On April 27, 2017, the inaugural flight between Kalibo and Seoul commenced using an Airbus A320-232.

In 2019, the airline ranked fourth among Philippine carriers in terms of the number of international passengers. It flew 250,977 passengers out of a total of 12,423,134 flown by the top three Philippine carriers: Philippine Airlines, Cebu Pacific, and Philippines AirAsia.

Destinations
As of January 2020, Pan Pacific Airlines serves the following destinations:

Fleet
As of December 2022, Pan Pacific Airlines does not operate any aircraft.

References 

Airlines of the Philippines
Airlines established in 2017
Kalibo
Philippine companies established in 2017
Airlines established in 1973
Philippine companies established in 1973